Rhododendron sikayotaizanense (志佳阳杜鹃) is a rhododendron species native to Taiwan. It is a shrub with small, leathery leaves that are oblong to ovate-oblong, 0.4–1.4 × 0.2–0.6 cm in size. Flowers are red.

References
 Masamune, Trans. Nat. Hist. Soc. Taiwan. 29: 27. 1939.
 Plants of Taiwan

sikayotaizanense